In finance, an electronic trading platform also known as an online trading platform, is a computer software program that can be used to place orders for financial products over a network with a financial intermediary. Various financial products can be traded by the trading platform, over a communication network with a financial intermediary or directly between the participants or members of the trading platform.  This includes products such as stocks, bonds, currencies, commodities, derivatives and others, with a financial intermediary, such as brokers, market makers, Investment banks or stock exchanges.  Such platforms allow electronic trading to be carried out by users from any location and are in contrast to traditional floor trading using open outcry and telephone based trading. Sometimes the term trading platform is also used in reference to the trading software alone. 

Electronic trading platforms typically stream live market prices on which users can trade and may provide additional trading tools, such as charting packages, news feeds and account management functions. Some platforms have been specifically designed to allow individuals to gain access to financial markets that could formerly only be accessed by specialist trading firms. They may also be designed to automatically trade specific strategies based on technical analysis or to do high-frequency trading.

Electronic trading platforms are usually mobile-friendly and available for Windows, Mac, Linux, iOS and Android.

Etymology
The term 'trading platform' is generally used to avoid confusion with 'trading system' which is more often associated with the trading method or strategy rather than the computer system used to execute orders within financial circles.  In this case platform is used to mean a type of computing system or operating environment such as a database or other specific software.

Historic development
Transactions have traditionally been handled manually, between brokers or counterparties.  However, starting in the 1970s, a greater portion of transactions have migrated to electronic trading platforms. These may include electronic communication networks, alternative trading systems, "dark pools" and others.

The first electronic trading platforms were typically associated with stock exchanges and allowed brokers to place orders remotely using private dedicated networks and dumb terminals. Early systems would not always provide live streaming prices and instead allowed brokers or clients to place an order which would be confirmed some time later; these were known as 'request for quote' based systems.

Trading systems evolved to allow for live streaming prices and near instant execution of orders as well as using the internet as the underlying network meaning that location became much less relevant. Some electronic trading platforms have built in scripting tools and even APIs allowing traders to develop automatic or algorithmic trading systems and robots.

The client graphical user interface of the electronic trading platforms can be used to place various orders and are also sometimes called trading turrets (though this may be a misuse of the term, as some refer to the specialized PBX phones used by traders).

During the period from 2001 to 2005, the development and proliferation of trading platforms saw the setting up of dedicated online trading portals, which were electronic online venues with a choice of many electronic trading platforms rather than being restricted to one institution's offering.

See also
Automated trading system
Electronic communication network (ECN)
Retail forex platform
Single-dealer platform
Stock market data systems
Straight-through processing (STP)
Technical analysis software
Trading room
Trading system
High-frequency trading (HFT)

References

 
Share trading